Yafran or Yifren is one of the districts of Libya (baladiyat). It is located in the northwest part of the country and its capital is Yafran. Between the 2007 reorganization of districts and the 2013 reorganization, most of its territory was part of Jabal al Gharbi District, although the southwestern part was in Nalut District. In 2013, its territory was placed in Nafusa Mountains District. However, by 2015 it had been restored as a district.

Boundaries

From 2001 to 2007, Yafran bordered the following districts:
Sabratha wa Sorman - north;
Zawiya - northeast, at a quadripoint;
Jafara - northeast;
Gharyan - east;
Mizda - southeast;
Nalut - southwest; and
Nuqat al Khams - northwest.

There is not accord on the boundaries of Yafran District between 1995 and 2001.

From 1983 to 1995, Yafran bordered the following districts:
Nuqat al Khams - northwest;
Zawiya - north;
Gharyan - east and south; and 
Ghadames - south and west.

References

Former districts of Libya